Anglicare Australia is the national  umbrella community services body of  agencies associated with each diocese of the Anglican Church of Australia.

Anglicare is also a brand name under which many Australian Anglican community services agencies operate although they may be separate legal entities.

State of the Family Report
Anglicare Australia has been publishing an annual State of the Family report each year since 2000.
Positions Vacant: When the Jobs Aren't There (2016)
Who is being left behind? (2015)
Being a/part (2014)
Paying Attention (2013)
When there’s not enough to eat (2012), 2 volumes
Staying Power (2011)
In From the Edge (2010)
Beyond Economics - families in the forefront (2009)
Creative Tension: Australia's Social Inclusion Agenda (2008)
Not produced 2007
Life on a Low Income (2006)
What do Australian Families look like today? (2005)
Missing out: Youth in Australia today, Mark Jeffery, (2004)
Children growing up in Poverty, Dr Ann Neville, (2003)
Unemployment and Poverty, Dr Ann Nevile, (2002)
Economic and Social Exclusion, Dr Ann Nevile, (2001)
Families as Carers - Families fighting - Economic state of Families, Dr Ann Nevile (2000)

Rental Affordability Snapshot
Anglicare Australia have released reports on housing and rental affordability issues since 2009, the 2016 Rental Affordability Snapshot (April 2016) received national media coverage.

See also
Anglican Church of Australia#Welfare and education
Official Website

References

External links
Anglicare Australia
Anglicare Victoria

Anglican Church of Australia
Charities based in Australia
Social work organisations in Australia